Shurab-e Kabir (also Romanized as Shūrāb-e Kabīr) is a village in Saman Rural District, Saman County, Chaharmahal and Bakhtiari Province, Iran. At the 2006 census, its population was 438, in 109 families. The village is populated by Persians.

References 

Populated places in Saman County